Singhasari temple or Candi Singhasari is a 13th-century syncretic Hindu temple located in Singosari district, Malang Regency, East Java in Indonesia.

Location
The temple is located on Jalan Kertanegara, Candirenggo  village, Singosari district, about 10 kilometres north from Malang city, on the valley between two mountain ranges, the Tengger-Bromo in the east and Arjuno-Welirang in the west, with elevation 512 metres above sea level. The temple orientation is facing northwest towards Mount Arjuno. It is linked to the historical Singhasari kingdom of East Java, as the site around the temple is believed to be the center of Javanese court of Singhasari.

History
The temple was mentioned in the Javanese poem Nagarakretagama canto 37:7 and 38:3 and also in Gajah Mada inscription dated 1351 and discovered in the temple's yard. According to these sources, the temple is the funerary temple of King Kertanagara (ruled 1268 — 1292), the last king of the Singhasari dynasty, whose assassination in 1292 by Jayakatwang of Gelang-gelang finally led to the establishment of Majapahit rule.

The temple's unfinished state can be seen in the incomplete kala head over its lower entrance. The temple faces northwest. Its lower level is Shaiva, but the temple has a second cella on the upper level, that was a Buddhist dedication. Alternate spellings: Kertanagara for Kertanegara, and Singosari for Singhasari.

Significant features of the temple include:
 A pair of colossal Dvarapalas--giant monolith statues as the guardians of Singhasari royal cemeteries
 A well-carved Kala on the west upper face
 A large original statue of Shiva as Batara Guru (or, perhaps, Shiva as Agastya) in the lower southern cella.

Gallery

See also 

Buddhism in Indonesia
Candi of Indonesia
Hinduism in Indonesia
Hinduism in Java
Indonesian Esoteric Buddhism
Prajnaparamita of Java

References 

Singhasari
Singhasari
Cultural Properties of Indonesia in East Java
Singhasari
1336 establishments in Asia
13th-century Buddhist temples
13th-century Hindu temples